Dedicated on October 21, 1993, the Cecil H. and Ida M. Green Earth Sciences Research Building at Stanford University houses classrooms, offices, and laboratories for research in the field of earth sciences.  The building's extended basement contains the sunken Kresge Plaza, in which rock sculptures are designed to look like a miniature version of local geologic faults.

References
Joncas, Richard, and David J Neuman, and Paul V Turner. Stanford University. Princeton Architectural Press. 1999. Pg 144.

External links 
Map: 

Stanford University buildings and structures
Buildings and structures completed in 1993
Earth science research institutes